Franco Agustín Quinteros (born 13 October 1998) is an Argentine professional footballer who plays as a left-back for Sarmiento, on loan from Banfield.

Professional career
On 11 June 2019, Quinteros signed his first professional contract with Banfield. Quinteros made his professional debut with Banfield in a 3-3 Argentine Primera División tie with Patronato on 26 January 2020. In June 2022, Quinteros joined Sarmiento on a one-year loan deal.

References

External links
 

1998 births
Living people
Footballers from Rosario, Santa Fe
Argentine footballers
Association football fullbacks
Club Atlético Banfield footballers
Club Atlético Sarmiento footballers
Argentine Primera División players